Achalady (ಅಚ್ಲಾಡಿ)is a village in the southern state of Karnataka, India. It is located in the Brahmavara taluk of Udupi district in Karnataka.

With the approximate population of 5000 people living in harmony with different caste, creed and religion. This village was ruled by Adar (ಅಡಾರ್) family under the control of different Royal dynasties like Vijayanagara, Tuluva, Alupa, and many more who ruled South India and during British rule Adars were working for Madras State. After independence the Village is now under the governance of state and central governments.

See also
 Udupi
 Districts of Karnataka

References

External links
 http://Udupi.nic.in/

Villages in Udupi district